Rissiana is a village situated near Samundri, Faisalabad, Pakistan. There are actually two villages named Rissiana in this area; Rissiana Kalan (Bara Rissiana) and Rissiana Khurd (Chota Rissiana).  Both have the same village number (138 GB) and are located two kilometers apart. Rissiana used to be called Case Garh, and this name is still used in many official documents. The below details represents the demographics of Rissiana Khurd. Before the partition of sub continent in 1947, The village of Rissiana existed with Sikh majority. Rana Atta Muhammad is considered to be the pioneer immigrant who arrived here with his family from Sosana village of district Hushiarpur  Indian Punjab. Sosana was a very small village but it has generated very prominent figures who contributed a lot for the development of Pakistan like Dr. Muhammad Saleem Khan and his son Rana Ayyaz Saleem (Senior Superintendent Police), Dr. Iqrar Ahmad Khan (SI), Vice Chancellor of University of Agriculture (Faisalabad) and Waseem Afzal (Central Superior Services of Pakistan) officer.

Education and Major Figures of Rissiana
The literacy rate is about 75% and the younger generation is much committed for higher education for which they have to travel to big cities. The major educated personalities of this village include Lieutenant Colonel (R) Dr. Abdul Latif, Rana Faryad Hussain (Retired Associate professor of English at Government degree College Samundri), Rana Khalid Jamil Sohail (Pakistan Air Force), Dr. Abdul Rehman (Nuclear Institute of Agriculture and Biology),  Rana Abaid Ur Rehman Working at Standard Chartered Bank Pakistan Limited as Manager Foreign Trade ,  Mr. Rana Mahmood khan (ex General Manager Gojra Samundri sugar mill), Mr. Abdul Razzaq (Assistant Professor of Zoology at Government Degree College Samundri), Mr. Ghulam Qadir (Retired Assistant Vice President, Allied Bank of Pakistan), Mr. Habib Jilani (Executive District Officer Finance), Dr. Abdul Qayyum (State Bank of Pakistan), Col. Saeed Khan, Admiral Javed Iqbal, Mr. Abdul Qadir (Deputy Military Accountant General Pakistan), Mr. Bhadur Ali (Lecturer at Government College) Dr. Muhammad Abdullah, Engineer Asad Ullah Khan, Dr. Bushra Abdul Rehman, Dr. Sidra Ghazanfar and various others. Two young men offered blood in 1971 war against India therefore this village is also called the village of SHUHADA (martyr people)

Economy
The economy of Rissiana is mainly based upon agriculture. The land of Rissiana is very fertile, but the subsoil water is brackish, forcing farmers to rely upon a meager canal supply which is meager.  For this reason, Rissiana has seen a major decline in agriculture.  However, sufficient wheat, maize, sugarcane, guavas, Kinnow, jaman, and fodder are produced here.  These crops both satisfy the local needs and are sold in the grain market of nearby Samundri. The younger generations of Rissiana increasingly leave the area and move to cities to find employment and higher education opportunities.  The area around Rissiana is irrigated by a distributary of British-built Canal 'Gogera Branch' that is also abbreviated as GB.  Hence, the official number of village is 138 GB.

Ethnic makeup
Nearly all the inhabitants of Rissiana Khurd migrated to Punjab, India. Majority, people belonging to major castes are living in this village. These three castes include Rajput, Jutt, and Gujjar. Besides the majority of Muslims inhabitants, there are also living a few Christians in the village.

Infrastructure
Rissiana has one primary school for boys and one middle school for girls, paved roads, telephone and power lines, four mosques and a filtration plant for the supply of clean drinking water. The towers of various mobile operators are located in Rissiana which help the local people to remain in touch with their beloved ones.

References

Villages in Faisalabad District